Paracatu  may refer to:
Paracatu, Minas Gerais, a municipality in the state of Minas Gerais, Brazil
Paracatu River, a river in the state of Minas Gerais, Brazil